The Nrupatunga Award is an award for excellence in Kannada literature in the Indian state of Karnataka. The award was instituted by the Kannada Sahitya Parishat and is sponsored by the Bangalore Metropolitan Transport Corporation (BMTC). Instituted in honor of the Rashtrakuta King Nrupatunga Amoghavarsha I (ruled c. 814–878), the award carries a purse of ₹700,001. King Nrupatunga finds an important place in the history of India in general and Karnataka in particular for his patronage and contribution to the Kannada language in the 9th century.

List of awardees

2022
Vaidehi (Janaki Srinivas Murti) ನೃಪತುಂಗ ಪ್ರಶಸ್ತಿ ಪಡೆದ ಎರಡನೇ ಮಹಿಳೆ (ಮೊದಲ ಮಹಿಳೆ ಸಾರಾ ಅಬೂಬಕ್ಕರ್)

Further reading

References

External links
 Nrupathunga Sahitya Prashasti (in Kannada). Karnataka Sahitya Academy

Kannada literature
Indian literary awards
Awards established in 2007
2007 establishments in Karnataka